William Newton Stirling (died 13 November 1914) was a Scottish football player, who played as forward for Lomas Athletic Club and Lomas Academy. He was top scorer in the championship of 1897.

Career 
Born in Scotland, Stirling began his career with Lomas Athletic Club in 1891. With Lomas, he won his first title in 1893. He would win a total of five championships in 1893, 1894, 1895, 1897 and 1898, always playing for Lomas.

Death
Stirling had been living in La Paz, Entre Ríos, Argentina. He drowned at sea in 1914.

Titles 
Lomas A.C.
 Primera División (5): 1893, 1894, 1895, 1897, 1898
Lomas Academy
 Primera División (1): 1896

References 

Scottish footballers
s
Footballers from Buenos Aires
Scottish emigrants to Argentina
Year of birth missing
1914 deaths
Place of birth missing
Deaths by drowning
People who died at sea
Association football forwards